Turbinellinae are a subfamily of large deepwater sea snails, marine gastropod mollusks in the family Turbinellidae.

This subfamily is in the family Turbinellidae within the clade Neogastropoda (according to the taxonomy of the Gastropoda by Bouchet & Rocroi, 2005).

This is a small subfamily with only three genera and some 10 extant species described.

Distribution
Species of this subfamily can be found in the Indian Ocean and in the Caribbean. The species Syrinx aruanus (Linnaeus, 1758), the largest living gastropod, is distributed along the coasts of Western and Northern Australia to Papua New Guinea.

Description
Species in this family have thick-shelled, fusiform shells with conical-shaped whorls. The large body whorl ends in a long siphonal canal. The columella contains three to four plaits.

Genera and species
Genera in the subfamily Turbinellinae include :
 Cryptofusus Beu, 2011
 Syrinx Röding, 1798
 Turbinella Lamarck, 1799
Genus brought into synonymy 
 Buccinella Perry, 1811 : synonym of Turbinella Lamarck, 1799

References

 Vaught, K.C. (1989). A classification of the living Mollusca. American Malacologists: Melbourne, FL (USA). . XII, 195 pp.

Turbinellidae